Anton Paskalev (born 6 November 1958) is a retired Bulgarian pole vaulter.

He finished seventh at the 1980 European Indoor Championships.

His personal best jump was 5.60 metres, achieved in June 1984 in Sofia. This ranks him tenth among Bulgarian pole vaulters, only behind Spas Bukhalov, Atanas Tarev, Nikolay Nikolov, Stanimir Penchev, Delko Lesov, Ilian Efremov, Ivo Yanchev, Valentin Videv, and Galin Nikov.

References

1958 births
Living people
Bulgarian male pole vaulters